Multani Mal Modi College is an Indian College. It is located in Patiala, Punjab, India.

History
It was established in 1967 with financial help from Gujjar Mal Modi.

It is affiliated to Punjabi University, Patiala, and is managed by Rai Bahadur Multani Mal Modi Charitable Trust.
It was established by the late Padma Bhushan, Rai Bahadur Seth Gujjar Mal Modi, a business magnate of India, in the memory of his father Rai Bahadur Seth Multani Mal Modi. 
Its foundation stone was laid by Dr Dharam Vira, ICS, the then Governor of Punjab on 21 September 1966 and the first academic session commenced in July 1967. The college is owned and maintained by the magnanimous and enlightened Modi Education Society. It is headed by its Chairman Seth Sudarshan Kumar Modi.

Principal and their official tenure

Notable alumni
 Gurcharan Singh Channi (TV filmmaker, actor, theater personality, playwright and activist).
 Navneet Virk / Navneet Nishan (Bollywood Actress)
 Chander Shekhar Gurera / Shekhar Gurera (Editorial Cartoonist) 
 Vijay Inder Singla ( Indian politician, member of Punjab Legislative Assembly)
 Pardeep K Markanday  (Chief Executive Trident Group of Companies Ludhiana) .

Courses Available 
Commerce Department

Science Department

Computer Science Department

Fashion Designing Department

Humanities

UGC Add-on Cources

NCC

Sports Facilities

References 

Universities and colleges in Punjab, India
Education in Patiala